Anne, Lady Fairfax (born Anne Vere, also known as Anne Fairfax; 1617/1618 – 1665) was an English noblewoman. She was the wife of Thomas Fairfax, 3rd Lord Fairfax of Cameron, commander-in-chief of the New Model Army. She followed her husband as he fought and she was briefly taken prisoner. It is said that she was ejected after heckling the court at the trial of Charles I.

Life
Anne Vere was born in 1617 or 1618 in the Netherlands. Her parents were Mary and Horace Vere, 1st Baron Vere of Tilbury (1565-1635). Her father served as a commander during the Eighty Years' War and the Thirty Years War. In 1637 Anne married Thomas Fairfax, who rose to lead (1645-1650) the New Model Army during the English Civil War. Anne was a woman of influence and she accompanied her husband to battles. Taken prisoner near Bradford by William Cavendish, 1st Duke of Newcastle, she was released a few days later and given an escort back to her husband's army.

Her husband was placed at the head of the judges who were to try Charles I, but convinced that the King's death was intended, he refused to act. Fairfax did not attend the King's trial (January 1649) but Anne did. When the court called the name of Fairfax, it is said that his wife, Anne Fairfax, said "he had more wit than to be there". Later when the court said that they were acting for "all the good people of England", she shouted ‘No, nor the hundredth part of them!". This resulted in an investigation and Anne was asked or required to leave the court.  It was said that Anne could not forbear, as Bulstrode Whitelocke says, to exclaim aloud against the proceedings of the High Court of Justice. In February 1649 Fairfax was elected Member of Parliament for Cirencester in the Rump Parliament. In January 1649 John Geree asked Anne and her mother to intercede on the King's behalf to prevent his execution.

Anne's daughter Mary married the royalist George Villiers, 2nd Duke of Buckingham when he returned to England in 1657. This was despite her betrothal to Philip Stanhope, 2nd Earl of Chesterfield.

Anne and her husband had to negotiate a £20,000 surety to allow the release of their son-in-law, the  Duke of Buckingham, from the Tower of London in 1659 after he was arrested.

Lady Anne Fairfax died in Nun Appleton Hall in 1665. Her husband died there six years later.

References

Sources

1610s births
1665 deaths
Women in the English Civil War
Daughters of barons
Ladies of Parliament
Wives of knights